Jan Roos may refer to:

 Jan Roos (journalist) (born 1977), Dutch journalist
 Jan Roos (painter) (1591–1638), Flemish painter